Bowie is an unincorporated community in Delta County, in the U.S. state of Colorado.

History
A post office called Bowie was established in 1907, and remained in operation until 1967. The community was named after Alexander Bowie, the proprietor of a local mine.

References

Unincorporated communities in Delta County, Colorado
Unincorporated communities in Colorado